Miguel Ángel Hoyo Ramos (born 11 October 1973) is a Spanish basketball head coach for CSU Sibiu of the Liga Națională.

Professional career
In 2013, Hoyo was offered a coaching offer by the club director of the Malabo Kings of the Equatorian Basketball League. He gladly accepted their offer and described his coaching philosophy as local-centric as much as possible with principles from the European style of basketball. He then guided the team to a league title and league cup within that season.

In December 2021, he accepted a coaching offer at Romania wherein he would be the head coach for the CSU Sibiu of the Liga Națională.

Coaching Style 
Hoyo stated that he is a defensive-oriented coach wherein he pushes his players to the limit when it comes to the defensive side. On the offensive side, he said that: "I like the player to make his own decisions on the court and within that we have a concept game where the player is always free to play his 1x1 if he has the ball and to play without the ball depending on what his partner does. . I try to make the player think and be able to read and understand the game."

References

External links
Miguel Angel Hoyo basketball profile

1973 births
Living people
Sportspeople from Ceuta
Spanish basketball coaches